Sian Eleri is a Welsh radio presenter. She is best known for presenting her shows on BBC Radio 1 and Radio Cymru.

Early life
Sian Eleri is from Caernarfon. She studied journalism at the University of Leeds.

Career
Prior to joining Radio 1, Eleri presented on BBC Radio Cymru.

Eleri covered Phil Taggart's Chillest Show on BBC Radio 1 during Christmas 2019. In November 2020, it was announced that Eleri would take over Phil Taggart's show following his departure from the station. On 20 April 2021, further timetable changes were announced as it was revealed Annie Mac would leave the station. Eleri will continue presenting on Sunday nights but will also present the Powerdown Playlist from 10 to 11pm, Monday to Wednesday, a slot previously occupied by Jack Saunders.  The programme is also streamed on Radio 1's sister station, BBC Radio 1 Relax. 

Eleri curates an event series of artist performances titled Tonna (translating to the colloquial form of waves in Welsh). The event is held at the venue OMERA, London. Previous artists who have performed include Jordan Stephens, Lucy Blue and others.

References

External links
Radio 1's Power Down Playlist with Sian Eleri (BBC Radio 1)
Radio 1's Chillest Show (BBC Radio 1)

BBC Radio 1 presenters
Welsh radio presenters
Welsh women radio presenters
Alumni of the University of Leeds
Living people
People from Caernarfon
Year of birth missing (living people)